Parachute Ninja is an action iOS game developed by American studio Freeverse Inc. and released Jan 28, 2010.

Critical reception
The game has a Metacritic rating of 89% based on 6 critic reviews.

The No DPad review said "If you have liked games like the classic Doodle Jump or the newer Bird Strike, you will love Parachute Ninja."

148Apps agreed: "The Story Mode on its own would be enough to garner high praise, but with the addition of the Survival Mode, Parachute Ninja really is a must buy."

AppSpy mentioned that the game is "very addictive" while Touch Arcade wrote "The art style is cute, the gameplay is fun and well-suited to the IPhone, and the two modes are neatly packaged and make the game easy to look at and play. Parachute Ninja is an easy purchase."

Pocket Gamer UK said "As expressive as its ninja's dashing eyebrows, Parachute Ninja is a great little game that builds on strong tactile physics gameplay with subtle level design."

References

2010 video games
Action video games
IOS games
IOS-only games
Video games about ninja
Video games developed in the United States
Freeverse Inc. games